Charles Rickerson (1803 - ?) was a farmer from Medina, Wisconsin who served a single one-year term as a Democratic member of the Wisconsin State Assembly from Dane County for the 1849 session (2nd Wisconsin Legislature).

Public office 
On April 4, the first town meeting of the Town of Medina was held, and Rickerson was elected as a "school commissioner" (equivalent of a school board member).

At the time he took office in the Assembly in January 1849, he was described as 45 years old, a farmer from Rhode Island who had been in Wisconsin for five years. His district included the Towns of Cottage Grove, Sun Prairie and Windsor.

Personal life 
In 1849, he was one of the initial members of the newly-organized Wisconsin State Agricultural Society. He chaired the Dane County Democratic convention in August, and was a delegate to the Wisconsin state Democratic convention held in September.

References 

Farmers from Wisconsin
Democratic Party members of the Wisconsin State Assembly
People from Medina (town), Wisconsin
People from Rhode Island
1803 births
19th-century American politicians
School board members in Wisconsin
Year of death missing